Guzmania conifera is a species of flowering plant in the Bromeliaceae family. It is native to Ecuador and Peru.

Cultivars
 Guzmania 'Candy Corn'
 Guzmania 'Equator'
 Guzmania 'Graaf Van Hoorn'
 Guzmania 'Lollipop'
 Guzmania 'Torch'

References

BSI Cultivar Registry Retrieved 11 October 2009

conifera
Flora of Ecuador
Taxa named by Édouard André
Taxa named by Carl Christian Mez